Purussaurus is an extinct genus of giant caiman that lived in South America during the Miocene epoch, from the Friasian to the Huayquerian in the SALMA classification. It is known from skull material found in the Brazilian and Peruvian Amazon, Colombian Villavieja Formation, Panamanian Culebra Formation and the Urumaco and Socorro Formations of northern Venezuela.

Description 

As only skulls have been found, the actual length is not certain. Bite force has been estimated to be around 52,500 N (around 5.3 metric tons-force), with upper estimates indicating that Purussaurus was capable of generating 69,000 N (around 7 metric tons-force). The large size and estimated strength of this animal appears to have allowed it to include a wide range of prey in its diet, making it an apex predator in its ecosystem. As an adult, it would have preyed upon large to very large vertebrates such as the xenarthrans and notoungulates present, with no real competition from sympatric, smaller, carnivores. Researchers have proposed that the large size of Purussaurus, though offering many advantages, may also have led to its vulnerability. The constantly changing environment on a large geological scale may have reduced its long-term survival, favoring smaller species more resilient to ecological shifts. In other words, it was over-specialised and couldn't survive when its habitat changed, unlike smaller related species of caiman.

The skeletal anatomy of P. mirandai shows some adaptations for more upright limb orientation or weight support. Unlike all other members of the crown Crocodylia, which have two sacrals, P. mirandai have three.

The teeth vary between the three species of Purussaurus, but are always around 50 mm (2 in) long and curve slightly backwards. They have small ridges along two of the edges which resemble those in ziphodonts. This indicates that Purussaurus hunted large vertebrates, as these ridges are used for puncturing and holding on to flesh. The teeth are slightly flattened at the top and are roughly conical, which means that they would have been unlikely to break on impact with a thick bone. Teeth at the anterior are taller and more pointed, whereas those at the posterior are lower and more rounded.

Purussaurus is one of the largest known crocodyliformes ever to have existed. Three other extinct crocodyliformes, Sarcosuchus, Deinosuchus, and Rhamphosuchus had similar body sizes. Sarcosuchus and Deinosuchus had similar proportions, but both were geologically much older, dating from the Early and Late Cretaceous, respectively. One study also indicates that Purussaurus may have been heavier than either Sarcosuchus or Deinosuchus, as it had a much broader, shorter snout and this would require a thicker, stronger neck to support the larger head. Rhamphosuchus lived around the same time as Purussaurus, but was slightly smaller, had a more gharial-like snout and lived in India. During the summer of 2005, a Franco-Peruvian expedition (the Fitzcarrald expedition) found new fossils of Purussaurus in the Peruvian Amazon (600 km from Lima).

Analysis of a biomechanical model of the skull of Purussaurus indicated that it was capable of performing the "death roll" maneuver used by extant crocodilians to subdue and dismember their prey. 

All sense organs (eyes, ears, nostrils) were at the very top of the head, indicating that Purussaurus was an ambush predator like many modern caimans.

Paleoecology 
 
Stupendemys, crocodilians including Charactosuchus, Gryposuchus, and Mourasuchus, Anhinga birds, and mammals including sloths, bats, rodents such as relatives of the modern capybara weighing up to 700 kilograms (1540 lb), the primate Stirtonia, and river dolphins were all present, and would probably all have been eaten by Purussaurus. Rivers, floodplains, and lake environments were present. Marine and freshwater fish, turtles, crocodilians, and terrestrial and aquatic mammals are associated with Venezuelan P. mirandai. Its environment is described as tropical and coastal.
The earlier Colombian P. neivensis lived alongside a massive variety of fauna, including astrapotheres like Granastrapotherium and Xenastrapotherium, the early species of Mourasuchus and Gryposuchus, and the terrestrial crocodyliform Langstonia. This fauna dates from 13 million years ago, in the Laventan stage of the Late Miocene.

Etymology
The genus was named for the Purus River where its fossils were first found.

Distribution 
Fossils of Purussaurus have been found in:

Miocene
 Solimões Formation, Brazil
 Honda Group and Castilletes Formation, Colombia
 Culebra Formation, Panama
 Fitzcarrald Arch and Pebas Formation, Peru
 Urumaco Formation, Urumaco and Socorro Formation, Venezuela

See also 

 Mourasuchus

References

Further reading

External links 
 Tetrapod Zoology post on Purussaurus
  UFAC
  Article about Purussaurus on DinosaurusBlog

Alligatoridae
Prehistoric pseudosuchian genera
Miocene crocodylomorphs
Miocene reptiles of South America
Miocene reptiles of North America
Montehermosan
Huayquerian
Chasicoan
Mayoan
Laventan
Colloncuran
Friasian
Neogene Brazil
Neogene Colombia
Neogene Panama
Neogene Peru
Neogene Venezuela
Fossils of Brazil
Fossils of Colombia
Honda Group, Colombia
Fossils of Panama
Fossils of Peru
Fossils of Venezuela
Fossil taxa described in 1892
Taxa named by João Barbosa Rodrigues
Apex predators